Albert Benjamin Lewis (October 16, 1925 – August 7, 2021) was an American lawyer, accountant and politician from New York.

Life and career
Lewis was born on October 16, 1925. He attended Brooklyn College from 1943 to 1944, and served in the U.S. Army from 1944 to 1946. After the war he finished his college course, and graduated from St. John's University School of Law in January 1954. He became a CPA in October 1954, was admitted to the bar, and practiced law and public accountancy in Brooklyn. He married Sara Ann Beresniakoff.

Lewis was a Democratic member of the New York State Senate from 1967 to 1978, sitting in the 177th, 178th, 179th, 180th, 181st and 182nd New York State Legislatures.

On January 4, 1978, he was appointed as State Superintendent of Insurance. He remained on the post until March 1983. Afterwards he resumed the practice of law.

He was of counsel to the firm of D'Amato & Lynch LLP.

Lewis died in August 2021 at the age of 95.

References

1925 births
2021 deaths
Politicians from Brooklyn
Democratic Party New York (state) state senators
St. John's University School of Law alumni
Brooklyn College alumni
United States Army personnel of World War II